Fernon Wibier (born 25 February 1971) is a former professional tennis player from the Netherlands.  

Wibier enjoyed most of his tennis success while playing doubles.  During his career he won 1 doubles title.  He achieved a career-high doubles ranking of world No. 42 in 1997.

Career finals

Doubles (1 title, 3 runner-ups)

External links
 
 

1971 births
Living people
Dutch male tennis players
People from Avereest
Sportspeople from Overijssel